The discography of Crashdïet, a Swedish hard rock band, consists of five studio albums, eight singles, one EP, and two DVD. This list does not include solo material or sideprojects performed by the members.

Crashdïet is a hard rock band from Stockholm, Sweden. They are a part of the sleaze metal subgenre of glam metal. The band has released six albums, 2005's Rest in Sleaze, 2007's The Unattractive Revolution, 2010's Generation Wild, 2013's The Savage Playground, 2019's Rust, and 2022's Automaton.

Studio albums

Extended plays

Singles

DVDs

Music videos 

Discographies of Swedish artists
Rock music group discographies